Whole is the sixth studio album by American rock band SOiL, released in August 2013. It is the first album since 2004 to feature Ryan McCombs as lead vocalist, having returned to the band in 2011. The album was funded through Kickstarter, with the song "My Time" released exclusively for backers on December 10, 2012. The album version of "My Time" was changed slightly , while the Kickstarter version of the song was re-released in the compilation album Scream: The Essentials. A lyric video for the song "Amalgamation" was released on August 9, 2013 to promote the album. Whole features three singles, "Shine On", "The Hate Song" and "Way Gone". Additionally, a music video was produced for "Shine On".

Track listing

Personnel

SOiL
 Ryan McCombs – lead vocals
 Tim King - bass guitar, backing vocals
 Adam Zadel – lead guitar, backing vocals

Additional musicians
 Will Hunt – drums
 Mitch Gable – drums on "My Time"
 Mike Mushok – guitar solo on "Wake Up"

Production
 Ulrich Wild – producer, engineer, and mixer
 Don Byczynski – recording and engineering for the song "My Time"
 James Murphy – mastering

References

External links
 https://www.facebook.com/soilmusic
 https://www.twitter.com/soiltheband
 http://www.soiltheband.com
 http://www.soil.bigcartel.com

2013 albums
Soil (American band) albums
AFM Records albums
Albums produced by Ulrich Wild